Dębienko  is a village in the administrative district of Gmina Stęszew, within Poznań County, Greater Poland Voivodeship, in west-central Poland.

The village has a population of 480.

The Wielkopolski National Park is located near Dębienko.

History
During the German occupation of Poland, the local forest was the site of large massacres of Poles from the region committed by the occupiers in 1939–1940 (see Nazi crimes against the Polish nation). On 12–16 November 1939 the German police and SS murdered 60 Poles brought from the Fort VII concentration camp in Poznań in the forest. In January–April 1940 further executions took place, in which over 700 Poles were brought from Fort VII to the forest and murdered. The bodies were buried in several mass graves. In the last months of the war the occupiers burnt the bodies of the victims in an attempt to cover up the crime.

Transport
The Voivodeship road 311 runs through the village, and the Polish S5 highway runs nearby, north-west of the village.

References

Villages in Poznań County
Nazi war crimes in Poland